Jose "Joe" Bulaon Lingad (November 24, 1914 – December 16, 1980) was a Filipino lawyer, World War II veteran, politician and martyr who served as provincial governor of Pampanga from 1948 to 1951 and congressman from Pampanga from 1969 to 1972. He also became commissioner of the Bureau of Internal Revenue and Bureau of Customs then subsequently secretary of the Department of Labor and Employment.

Early life and education
Lingad was born in the barrio of San Jose Gumi, Lubao, Pampanga on November 24, 1914. He was the youngest of four children of Emigdio Lingad y Carlos and Irene Bulaon (from Arayat, Pampanga). Lingad studied in Lubao Central Elementary School and Pampanga High School for his primary and secondary education. In college, Lingad took up law at the University of the Philippines and Philippine Law School where he passed the bar exam on December 16, 1938. At age 24, he was elected councilor of Lubao, making him one of the youngest elected officials in the country.

Career during World War II

After the Japanese invasion of the Philippines in 1941, Lingad joined the armed resistance against the Japanese in Bataan. Served as chief of staff under the command of Colonel Edwin Ramsey. He survived the Bataan Death March and later joined the guerrilla movement where he would lead the Pampanga Military District.

Political career

Early career
In the 1947 general elections, Lingad was elected governor of Pampanga as a member of the Liberal Party at the age of 33. He also became vice-president of the League of Governors of the Philippines. Seated as governor in 1948, Lingad served a single term, being defeated to Rafael Lazatin for re-election in 1951 due to the fall-out from the Maliwalu massacre in Bacolor. Had Lingad stayed on as governor though, he would have been appointed by President Elpidio Quirino to lead Department of National Defense due to his stellar accomplishments at the time.

After his term as governor, Lingad was still recognized as the political kingpin of Pampanga. And during the elections of 1949, Lingad nominated Diosdado Macapagal, who was then serving as second secretary of the Philippine embassy in Washington, D.C. to run for the first Congressional district of Pampanga.

With the help and guidance of governor Lingad, Diosdado Macapagal would start his political career that would make him president of the Philippines one day. As they were childhood friends in the town of Lubao, Pampanga.

Cabinet official

When his Protégé Diosdado Macapagal was elected president in 1961, Lingad joined the Macapagal administration, first as Commissioner of Bureau of Internal Revenue, then Commissioner of Bureau of Customs and, ultimately Secretary of Labor.

Congressional career

In 1969, Lingad was elected to the House of Representatives under the Liberal Party banner representing the 1st District of Pampanga, the same seat Macapagal had won 20 years earlier. Lingad served in the 7th Congress from 1969 to 1972. Previously perceived as holding right-wing political views, Lingad shifted to the left while in Congress, supporting farmers' rights and dialogue with the leftist insurgency. Lingad's congressional career was abbreviated with the abolition of Congress following the declaration of martial law by Marcos in 1972. Lingad, a member of the political opposition against Marcos, was among the first political figures to be arrested and imprisoned on the day martial law was declared.

1980 Pampanga gubernatorial election
Lingad was released from prison after three months and he retired to his Pampanga farm. He was called out of retirement by the opposition leader Benigno Aquino Jr., who urged him to run for Pampanga governor in the January 1980 local elections as a candidate of the anti-Marcos opposition with his running mate Jose Suarez for vice governor. Lingad was defeated by Estelito Mendoza, but he raised charges of fraud which led to the staging of a new election for governor.

Personal life
Lingad had his first born Sylvia Lingad de Guzman (1942–2021) with former partner Consuelo Zita Perez. Later married to Estela Aranita Layug with five children including Emigdio "Emy" Layug Lingad (1953–2021), a former Member of Batasang Pambansa, Deputy Minister of Finance, congressman for 2nd District of Pampanga from 1987 to 1995 and Teresito "Terry" Layug Lingad (born 1948), former 3rd term municipal councilor of Lubao. 

Lingad had four children with her former partner, Catalina Canlas Mañgila. Among them are Jacqueline "Jacquie" Lingad Ricci, former San Francisco commissioner and president of San Francisco Juvenile Probation Commission.

His nephew, Josefo Sarmiento Lingad (1936–2005) was mayor of Lubao from 1965 to 1968.

Assassination and legacy
On December 16, 1980, at 7:40 in the morning, Lingad was shot in a gasoline station in the barangay San Agustin, San Fernando, Pampanga while buying a pack of cigarettes. His assassin Sgt. Roberto Tabanero, who died in a mysterious car accident before being prosecuted, was identified as a member of the Philippine Constabulary. National leaders from all sides of the political spectrum attended his wake. Lingad was interred at San Nicolas Catholic Cemetery in Lubao, Pampanga together with his parents. On November 25, 1989, Republic Act No. 6780 entitled "An Act of Changing the Name of the Central Luzon General Hospital located in the municipality of San Fernando, province of Pampanga, to Jose B. Lingad Memorial Regional Hospital was one of bills signed by then President Corazon C. Aquino. On that day the hospital was formally recognized as Jose B. Lingad Memorial Regional Hospital.

Ancestry

Notes

References

External links

 

1914 births
1980 deaths
Assassinated Filipino politicians
Deaths by firearm in the Philippines
Filipino democracy activists
Filipino prisoners and detainees
Philippine Army personnel
Bataan Death March prisoners
Kapampangan people
Liberal Party (Philippines) politicians
Filipino military personnel of World War II
Governors of Pampanga
Marcos martial law victims
People murdered in the Philippines
Individuals honored at the Bantayog ng mga Bayani
Lawyers honored at the Bantayog ng mga Bayani
Political prisoners
Members of the House of Representatives of the Philippines from Pampanga
Secretaries of Labor and Employment of the Philippines
Commissioners of the Bureau of Customs of the Philippines
20th-century Filipino lawyers
University of the Philippines alumni
Philippine Law School alumni
Filipino Roman Catholics
Macapagal administration cabinet members
Filipino people of World War II